99 is a 2009 Indian Hindi-language crime comedy film directed by Raj and D.K., starring Kunal Khemu, Boman Irani, Soha Ali Khan and Cyrus Broacha. The movie is set in the year 1999, with cricket controversies of that year as the backdrop. It was produced and distributed by "People Pictures", and was released on 15 May 2009.

Plot

Sachin (Kunal Khemu) and Zaramud (Cyrus Broacha) are two small-time crooks in Mumbai, who make a living out of duplicating mobile phone sim cards. Due to the overuse of a duplicated sim by a customer, the sim card company and the police are alerted. When the police raid their premises, they destroy all their equipment and escape. In the cat-and-mouse chase that follows, Zaramud breaks into a car along with Sachin to lay the police off their trail. However, the car meets with an accident. Although Sachin and Zaramud manage to escape with minor injuries, the car is damaged beyond repair. AGM (Mahesh Manjrekar), a bookie based out of Mumbai, who is the owner of this car, tracks them down. They are hired to work for AGM till the time they are capable of paying the compensation for the damages.

Rahul (Boman Irani), an executive in a currency exchange company in Delhi, has a penchant for betting and gambling. Rahul visits Mumbai on a conference, and decides to bet on the outcome of an India vs New Zealand cricket match. He borrows money from AGM, after being referred by a Delhi bookie named Bhuval Ram Kuber (Amit Mistry), and bets on India winning the match. However, India loses. In spite of owing money to AGM, Rahul continues in his gambling ways and plays teen patti with JC (Vinod Khanna), who is a big businessman and bookie. After Rahul goes all-in and JC raises on the bet, Rahul identifies JC's bluff and ends up winning. JC jokingly vows to beat Rahul some day.

Sachin and Zaramud prepare a list of individuals who owe money to AGM. Top of this list is Kewal Pandey (Raja Kapse), a Bhojpuri film actor, and next on the list is Rahul. Since Rahul is based out of Delhi which is outside the area of AGM's operations, AGM sends Sachin and Zaramud to Delhi to retrieve the money Rahul owes him. They reach Delhi and put up in a 5 star hotel. Sachin develops a liking towards Pooja (Soha Ali Khan), who is a floor manager in the hotel. The two bond over their mutual desire of owning an independent business and be their own boss, and Sachin informs Pooja about his idea of owning a coffee-shop someday and 'scoring a century in life'.

Rahul is met with Kuber and his solitary goon Dimple (Rajesh Singh) demanding money that Rahul owes Kuber. When he is unable to pay the money, Rahul gets beaten up and his phone is taken away. Sachin and Zaramud visit Rahul at his office to demand AGM's money, and takes US$50,000 that Rahul had just received from a client. However, on their way to the airport, all their belongings along the briefcase filled with money gets stolen. However, the thieves are unable to find the money in the secret compartment, and the briefcase ends up in the godown of the a Salesman (Pitobash), who sells stolen goods outside Rahul's office.

Sachin and Zaramud go back to Rahul to inform about the debacle. The three of them decide to bet on the outcome of the next India vs South Africa cricket match using information that Rahul believes JC is privy to. The three of them visit Kewal Pandey and extract half of what he owed to AGM, and decide to use it to place the bet. Kuber visits Rahul again, but this time gets badly beaten up by Sachin, who also manages to get Rahul's phone back. Rahul goes to the bar where he plays cards with JC, and strikes up a conversation with him in a bid to extract information about the match next day. JC obliges and asks Rahul to bet on South Africa as a key player on the Indian side had agreed to throw the match in exchange for money received from him.

Kuber informs AGM that Rahul had gotten him beaten up by two of his 'cousins', and AGM deciphers that these are Sachin and Zaramud. AGM sends one of his goons to Delhi, and himself follows suit. On the day of the match, after Rahul leaves to place the bet, Kuber reaches Sachin's room along with AGM's goon and kidnaps him. Sachin gets badly beaten up, but then manages knock Kuber and AGM's goon unconscious. He meets Pooja and Zaramud at the hotel bar and follows the proceedings of the match. India manages to win on the back of a brilliant century by Tendulkar and some errors on the field by South Africa. The three of them are distraught. However, Rahul returns and informs them that he had seen through JC's bluff again and had betted on India, along with a side bet on Tendulkar.

Sachin visits a garments shop in Palika Bazar to collect the money. Zaramud discovers through recorded conversations on JC's sim that they had duplicated that the match was fixed on the side of the South Africans, and JC was behind it. He hands over the recordings to the CBI. Sachin gets chased by the police immediately after he receives the bag full of money. He manages to reach his hotel room, although the police also follow him to the hotel. He finds AGM waiting in the room, and hands over the bag to AGM after AGM agrees never to bother Zaramud, Rahul or him again. As AGM reaches the hotel lobby, he is cornered by a group of policemen. There are sounds of shots being fired.

Kuber visits Rahul again to demand his money, and threatens him with a loaded revolver. In a fit of rage, Rahul snatches the revolver from Kuber and accidentally shoots him through his palm. Kuber is shocked, and takes Rahul's old car both as payment and for getting to the hospital. Soon after, the car crashes. Salesman visits Rahul at the office with the stolen briefcase, recognizing it to be his. Rahul finds the money intact in the secret compartment. Elsewhere, as Sachin and Zaramud checkout of the hotel, they are encountered by Kewal Pandey, who gives them the remaining half of the money he owed to AGM.

As the end credits roll, it is revealed that Sachin and Pooja have opened a coffee-shop, Zaramud has become a poster boy for fitness, and the recorded conversations from JC's sim had helped unearth the match-fixing scandal that had rocked the cricketing world in the year 2000.

Cast 
 Kunal Khemu as Sachin
 Boman Irani as Rahul Mehrotra 
 Soha Ali Khan as Pooja
 Cyrus Broacha as Zaramud
 Simone Singh as Jahnavi
 Mahesh Manjrekar as AGM
 Vinod Khanna as JC
 Sudesh Berry as Sunil Mehta
 Amit Mistry as Kuber
 Pitobash as Sales Man
 Dali Vivekanandan as Ray Ban
 Divya Bhatnagar as Item 'Rakhee'

Reception

Critical reception
Aseem Chhabra of Rediff.com gave the film 4 out 5 and told the viewers that "they will leave the theater laughing and entertained." Conversely, Elvis D'Silva writing for same website gave the film 2.5 out of 5, writing ″All told, 99 rates a solid B+ for effort and a C for actual delivery -- or in our star-studded vernacular, two-and-a-half of those five pointed little fellas.″ 

Indiatimes.com gave it 3.5 stars. Nikhat Kazmi of the Times Of India gave the movie 3 out of 5 stars stating that it has "a tangy, tongue-in-cheek tenor that ensures you never really lose the plot." Boxoffice.com said the "Bollywood flick should catch on with American audiences" and that "99 has potential to set new standard."

Taran Adarsh  of Bollywood Hungama gave the film 2.5 out of 5, ″On the whole, 99 appeals in parts, more towards the second half. The film holds appeal for the youth and should find patronage from this faction of moviegoers at multiplexes mainly.″

Box office 
The film was released on 15 May 2009 worldwide with about 500 prints. 99 had a slow start on Friday with 10–15%. Business picked up as reports were mainly positive. The film was a moderate box office success and was expected to find its patronage among the youth and the multiplex audiences to whom it is targeted.

Music

Reception
The film's music received mixed reviews from critics. Indiatimes gave the soundtrack three stars out of four, saying the songs "What's Up", "Soch Mat Dobara", "Punjab Size" were average while praising "Kal Ki Tarah" and "Delhi Destiny". Bollywood Hungama's Joginder Tuteja gave the album two and a half stars out of five.

Soundtrack

References

External links 
 

2009 films
2000s Hindi-language films
Films set in Delhi
Films set in Mumbai
Films set in 1999
Films about cricket in India
Films scored by Shamir Tandon
Indian crime comedy films
Hindi-language crime films
Films directed by Raj Nidimoru and Krishna D.K.